Left-hand path is a term used in Western esotericism.

Left-Hand Path may also refer to:
 Left Hand Path (album), a 1990 album by Entombed
 "Left-Hand Path" (Runaways), an episode of Runaways
 Vamachara, a Sanskrit term meaning "left-handed attainment"

See also
 Left Hand Pathology, a 2006 album by General Surgery